Boddam railway station was a railway station in Boddam, Aberdeenshire that served as the terminus of a now closed line from Ellon.

History
The station was opened on 2 August 1897 by the Great North of Scotland Railway. Services ran to Aberdeen and further afield. At the north side was the station building, on the east side was a locomotive and carriage shed and to the west of these was the signal box. The line closed to passenger trains on 31 October 1932 but goods traffic continued until 7 November 1945.

References 

 

Disused railway stations in Aberdeenshire
Former Great North of Scotland Railway stations
Railway stations in Great Britain opened in 1897
Railway stations in Great Britain closed in 1932
1897 establishments in Scotland
1945 disestablishments in Scotland